Anguliphantes is a genus of  dwarf spiders that was first described by Michael I. Saaristo & A. V. Tanasevitch in 1996.

Species
 it contains sixteen species:
Anguliphantes angulipalpis (Westring, 1851) (type) – Europe, Russia (Europe to West Siberia)
Anguliphantes cerinus (L. Koch, 1879) – Russia (West to South Siberia), Kazakhstan
Anguliphantes curvus (Tanasevitch, 1992) – Russia (Sakhalin)
Anguliphantes dybowskii (O. Pickard-Cambridge, 1873) – Russia (Urals to Far East), Mongolia
Anguliphantes karpinskii (O. Pickard-Cambridge, 1873) – Russia (Middle Siberia to Far East), Mongolia, China
Anguliphantes maritimus (Tanasevitch, 1988) – Russia (Far East), China
Anguliphantes monticola (Kulczyński, 1881) – Europe
Anguliphantes nasus (Paik, 1965) – China, Korea
Anguliphantes nepalensis (Tanasevitch, 1987) – India, Nepal, Pakistan
Anguliphantes nepalensoides Tanasevitch, 2011 – India
Anguliphantes ryvkini Tanasevitch, 2006 – Russia (Far East)
Anguliphantes sibiricus (Tanasevitch, 1986) – Russia (West to South Siberia)
Anguliphantes silli (Weiss, 1987) – Romania
Anguliphantes tripartitus (Miller & Svaton, 1978) – Central Europe
Anguliphantes ussuricus (Tanasevitch, 1988) – Russia (Far East)
Anguliphantes zygius (Tanasevitch, 1993) – Russia (Far East), China

See also
 List of Linyphiidae species

References

Araneomorphae genera
Cosmopolitan spiders
Linyphiidae
Taxa named by Michael Saaristo